The Order of the Knights Bannerets was a French knighthood mentioned in a biography of Sir Robert Bruce Cotton, 1st Baronet (1570-1631) by Thomas Smith.

Smith writes: "Ex omnibus inventis propositis illud uti videtur,de novo equitem ordine instituendo regi Jacobo I maxime placuit" (i.e. "Of all the proposed findings that were to be seen, the knighthood order newly formed by James I pleased especially ").

Ackermann mentions this chivalric order as historical order of France

Sources 
 Gustav Adolph Ackermann,  Ordensbuch, Sämtlicher in Europa blühender und erloschener Orden und Ehrenzeichen. Annaberg, 1855, p 244 n°190 "Orden der Bannerherren" - Google Books (Former orders of France : p. 205-214 + addings p. 244)

Knights Bannerets
Knights banneret of France